Scytalopus is a genus of small suboscine passerine birds belonging to the tapaculo family Rhinocryptidae. They are found in South and Central America from Tierra del Fuego to Costa Rica, but are absent from the Amazon Basin. They inhabit dense vegetation at or near ground-level and are mainly found in mountainous regions, particularly the Andes. They can be very difficult to see as they run through the undergrowth in a mouse-like fashion.

Description
They are plump with short tails that often are held cocked. Depending on species, the total length is 10–14 cm (4-5½ in). Their plumage is blackish or grey. Several species have brown bellies, rumps or flanks; often with some barring. A few have white crowns or eyebrows. Juveniles of most species are browner and have barred flanks. Many species are essentially impossible to separate by their plumage, but songs and calls are often distinctive and important for species identification.

Behavior
Their diet consists mainly of insects. Little is known about the breeding habits of most species but the eggs are usually white and the nest is usually ball-shaped and made of plant material such as root-fibres and mosses. It is built in a cavity in sites such as earth banks or among the roots or bark of trees.

Taxonomy
The genus Scytalopus was introduced in 1837 by the English ornithologist John Gould. The name combines the Ancient Greek skutalē or skutalon meaning "stick" with pous meaning "foot". The type species was specified in 1840 by George Robert Gray as the Magellanic tapaculo.

The species-limits within this genus is among the most complex matters in Neotropical ornithology. They are highly cryptic, and identification using visual features often is impossible. Vocal and biochemical data is typically needed to clarify the taxonomic status of the various populations. Several new species have been described in recent years (e.g. S. stilesi and S. rodriguezi from Colombia). The taxonomic status of many of the Andean species was resolved by Krabbe & Schulenberg (1997) who split a number of species and described three new ones.  The confusing situation is perhaps best illustrated by the fact that only 10 species were recognized in this genus in 1970 (Krabbe & Schulenberg, 2003), while the figure now is more than four times as high.  Additionally, still undescribed species are known to exist, while some species as currently defined actually may include several species (e.g. the southern population of the large-footed tapaculo may represent an undescribed species). Donegan & Avendano recently reviewed the Colombian and Venezuelan species, formally describing one new subspecies and providing details of a further three undescribed species or subspecies to be described in future publications.

The Brazilian taxa are similarly complex with several recently described species and considerable confusion surrounding the use of the scientific name Scytalopus speluncae.

Conservation
Some species have highly localized distributions, and being poor fliers, they easily become isolated in small populations. BirdLife International currently (2007) consider one species vulnerable (Scytalopus panamensis) and three species endangered (S. iraiensis, S. rodriguezi and S. robbinsi).

Species list
The genus contains 49 species. The white-breasted and Bahia tapaculos were formerly placed in this genus, but these two species are now known to be closer to the bristlefronts (genus Merulaxis) and have therefore been moved to Eleoscytalopus.

References

 Donegan, Thomas & Avendano, Jorge E. (2008): Notes on Tapaculos (Passeriformes: Rhinocryptidae) of the Eastern Andes of Colombia and Venezuelan Andes, with a new subspecies of Scytalopus griseicollis from Colombia. Ornitologia Colombiana 6. 24-65 PDF fulltext
Greeney, Harold F. & Gelis, Rudolphe A. (2005) The nest and nestlings of the Long-tailed Tapaculo (Scytalopus micropterus) in Ecuador, Ornitología Colombiana 3:88-91. Accessed 18/06/07.
Maurício, Giovanni Nachtigall (2005) Taxonomy of new populations in the Scytalopus speluncae group, with description of a new species and remarks on the systematics and biogeography of the complex (Passeriformes: Rhinocryptidae), Ararajuba 13 (1):7-28. Accessed 18/05/07.
Maurício, N. M, Matta, H., Bornschein, M. R., Cadena, C. D., Alvarenga, H., &  Bonatto, S. L. (2008) Hidden generic diversity in Neotropical birds: Molecular and anatomical data support a new genus for the “Scytalopus” indigoticus species-group (Aves: Rhinocryptidae). Molecular Phylogenetics and Evolution. 49(1): 125–135.
Raposo, Marcos A.; Stopiglia, Renata; Loskot, Vladimir & Kirwan, Guy M. (2006) The correct use of the name Scytalopus speluncae (Ménétriés, 1835), and the description of a new species of Brazilian tapaculo (Aves: Passeriformes: Rhinocryptidae), Zootaxa 1271: 37–56. Accessed 18/06/07.
South American Classification Committee (2007) A classification of the bird species of South America, part 7. Accessed 18/06/07.
 Comitê Brasileiro de Registros Ornitológicos: List of Birds in Brazil
 Avedaño, Jorge E., Cuervo, A., López-O., J. P., Gutiérrez-Pinto, N., Cortés-Diago, A. & Cadena, C. D. (2015): A new species of tapaculo (Rhinocryptidae: Scytalopus) from the Serranía de Perijá of Colombia and Venezuela, The Auk Volume 132, 2015, pp. 450–466.

 
Bird genera
Taxa named by John Gould